I Could Stay is the second single from Canadian/Jamaican singer Kreesha Turner's second studio album, Tropic Electric. The song was written by Kreesha Turner, Erika Nuri and Greg Ogan.

The single received Canadian airplay for almost two months before the song was official released onto iTunes.
The iTunes single only contains the radio edit of the track, much like Kreesha Turner's previous singles. "I Could Stay" was noted for referencing and sounding similar to Janet Jackson's "Runaway".

Music video
The music video premiered on Kreesha Turner's official VEVO channel, on November 15, 2011, the same day as the album Tropic Electric was released. The video was shot in Jamaica, as Kreesha wanted to capture the beauty of the country. Elements of the video, such as the scene in which Kreesha swings across water, were shot in the rain, due to a time limit placed on the production of the video.

Charts

Track listing

References

External links

Kreesha Turner songs
2011 songs
Songs written by Erika Nuri
Songs written by Kreesha Turner
EMI Records singles